The Southeast Asia Rural Social Leadership Institute (SEARSOLIN) is one of the research and social outreach units of Xavier University – Ateneo de Cagayan, located in Cagayan de Oro, Philippines.

It is an international training center dedicated to the formation of socially committed and competent leaders in the struggle for poverty alleviation and holistic human development within the context of diverse cultural and religious traditions in the Asia-Pacific and Africa. It aspires for no less than a just social order where respect for human dignity, deference of various religious beliefs, equitable distribution of wealth and care of the bounty of the earth shall prevail.

The training programs are geared towards the understanding of poverty, the process that lead or perpetuate it and adoption of the skills necessary to alleviate it such that in the final analysis, the poor will be primary beneficiaries of the SEARSOLIN programs.

It is part of the 50-hectare campus of the university located in the Upper Carmen area, known affectionately by students, staff, and alumni alike as the "Manresa Farm" (named after the town in Spain where St. Ignatius of Loyola, one of the three co-founders of the Society of Jesus, prayed in solitude in a nearby cave from 1522–23).

History

After the founding of the College of Agriculture of Xavier University – Ateneo de Cagayan in 1953, Fr. William F. Masterson, S.J. founded SEARSOLIN in 1964 as a research and training unit of the said College. It began with full support from MISEREOR, the international outreach arm of the German Bishops' Conference.

Since then, it has trained thousands of rural, social development leaders from different parts of the Asia–Pacific and Africa.

Programs offered
The Social Leadership Course is offered annually from June to December and is packaged in a monthly modular form in a series of ten modules that allows the participants more flexibility to select and stay for a shorter or longer period.

The modules are:
 Module 1: Participatory organizational and project management (June)
 Module 2: Sustainable agriculture (July)
 Module 3: Cooperative-ism and Cooperatives (August)
 Module 4: Project monitoring and evaluation (September)
 Module 5: Volunteer program development and management (September)
 Module 6: Peace building approaches to development (October)
 Module 7: Responsible and independent journalism (October)
 Module 8: Micro/Small enterprise development, business planning and microfinance (November)
 Module 9: Socioeconomic and environmental issues and interventions addressing urbanization in developing countries (November)
 Module 10: Development action plan (December)

The SEARSOLIN program has always been deliberately integrated and generalist, believing in training the whole person to enable her/him to be at the service of all, through the blending of value courses and social sciences as well as management and practical skills. SEARSOLIN focuses on the 'head' (theory/thinking), the 'heart' (values/loving), and the 'hands' (practical/doing). The pedagogy is more "hands-on" than strictly academic. The community live-in training of several months provides a unique experience and rich socio-cultural dynamics during which the international participants develop fellowship, camaraderie and leadership values and skills.

What SEARSOLIN stands for 
 South – because it caters to the developing nations of the South, or Third World, vis-à-vis the richer nations of the North.
 East – because it is in Asia, it builds on the rich cultural and religious traditions of the East.
 Asia – because SEARSOLIN's home is Asia and its trainees mainly come from the three sub-regions of Asia — South, Southeast, and East — even as it welcomes also participants from the Africa and the Pacific Islands.
 Rural – because its concerns are focused on rural development issues, including rural poverty alleviation as challenged by food security.
 Social – because it talks of the human person in society and deals with the imperatives of social justice.
 Leadership – because it strives to form leaders with conscience, competence, and commitment; leaders with a clear vision and the social skills needed for the development tasks ahead.
 Institute – because it is a training center with a time-tested program and a continuing fellowship among development workers in the field in the countries of Asia and the developing world.

See also 
 Asset-based community development
 Cagayan de Oro
 Xavier University – Ateneo de Cagayan

References

External links 
 Official website
 Xavier University – Ateneo de Cagayan
 MISREOR

Educational organizations based in the Philippines
Community development organizations
Urban agriculture